Michael Joseph Oakeshott FBA (11 December 1901 – 19 December 1990) was an English philosopher and political theorist who wrote about the philosophies of history, religion, aesthetics, education, and law.

Biography

Early life and education
Oakeshott was the son of Joseph Francis Oakeshott, a civil servant (latterly divisional head in the Inland Revenue) and member of the Fabian Society, and Frances Maude, daughter of George Thistle Hellicar, a well-off Islington silk-merchant. Though there is no evidence that he knew her, he was related by marriage to the women's rights activist Grace Oakeshott, and to the economist and social reformer Gilbert Slater. 

Michael Oakeshott attended St George's School, Harpenden, a new co-educational and 'progressive' boarding school from 1912 to 1920. He enjoyed his schooldays, and the Headmaster, the Rev. Cecil Grant, a disciple of Maria Montessori, later became a friend.  In 1920, Oakeshott matriculated with a Scholarship at Gonville and Caius College, Cambridge, where he read history, taking the Political Science options in both parts of the Tripos (Cambridge degree examinations). He graduated in 1923 with a first-class degree, subsequently (as is still normal at Cambridge) took an unexamined MA, and was elected a Fellow of Caius in 1925. While at Cambridge he admired the British idealist philosophers J. M. E. McTaggart and John Grote, and the medieval historian Zachary Nugent Brooke. He said that McTaggart's introductory lectures were the only formal philosophical training he ever received. The historian Herbert Butterfield was a contemporary, friend and fellow member of the Junior Historians society.

After graduation in 1923 he pursued his interests in theology and German literature in a summer course at the Universities of Marburg and Tuebingen, and again in 1925. In between, for a year, he taught literature as Senior English Master at King Edward VII Grammar School, Lytham St Anne's, while simultaneously writing his (successful) Fellowship dissertation, which he said was a 'dry run' for his first book, Experience and its Modes.

1930s
Oakeshott was dismayed by the political extremism that occurred in Europe during the 1930s, and his surviving lectures from this period reveal a dislike of Nazism and Marxism. He is said to have been the first at Cambridge to lecture on Marx. At the suggestion of Sir Ernest Barker, who wished to see Oakeshott succeed to his own Cambridge Chair of Political Science, in 1939 he produced an anthology, with commentary, of The Social and Political Doctrines of Contemporary Europe. For all its muddle and incoherence (as he saw it), he found Representative Democracy the least unsatisfactory, in part because 'the imposition of a universal plan of life on a society is at once stupid and immoral'.

Second World War
Although in his essay "The Claim of Politics" (1939), Oakeshott defended individuals' right to eschew political commitment, he joined the British Army after the fall of France in 1940, when he could have avoided conscription on grounds of age. He volunteered for the virtually suicidal Special Operations Executive (SOE), where the average life expectancy was about six weeks, and was interviewed by Hugh Trevor-Roper, but it was decided that he was "too unmistakably English" to conduct covert operations on the Continent. He saw active service in Europe with the battlefield intelligence unit Phantom, a semi-freelance quasi-Signals organisation which also had connections with the Special Air Service (SAS). Though always at the front, the unit was seldom directly involved in any actual fighting. Oakeshott's military competence did not go unnoticed, and he ended the war as Adjutant of Phantom's 'B' Squadron and acting major.

Postwar
In 1945 Oakeshott was demobilised and returned to Cambridge. In 1949 he left Cambridge for Nuffield College, Oxford, but after only two years, in 1951, he was appointed Professor of Political Science at the London School of Economics (LSE), succeeding the leftist Harold Laski, an appointment noted by the popular press. Oakeshott was deeply unsympathetic to the student activism at LSE during the late 1960s, and highly critical of (as he saw it) the authorities' insufficiently robust response. He retired from the LSE in 1969, but continued teaching and conducting seminars until 1980.

In his retirement he retreated to live quietly in a country cottage in Langton Matravers in Dorset with his third wife. He was twice divorced and had numerous affairs, many of them with wives of his students, colleagues and friends, and even with his son Simon's girlfriend. He also had a son out of wedlock, whom he abandoned together with the mother when the child was two, and whom he did not meet again for nearly twenty years. Oakeshott's most famous lover was Iris Murdoch.

Oakeshott lived long enough to experience increasing recognition, although he has become much more widely written about since his death. Oakeshott declined an offer to be made a Companion of Honour, for which he was proposed by Margaret Thatcher.

Philosophy

Early works

Oakeshott's early work, some of which has been published posthumously as What is History? and Other Essays (2004) and The Concept of a Philosophical Jurisprudence (2007), shows that he was more interested in the philosophical problems that derived from his historical studies than he was in the history, even though he was officially a historian. Some of his very early essays are on religion (of a Christian 'modernist' kind), though after his first marital break-up (c. 1934) he published no more on the topic except for a couple of pages in his magnum opus On Human Conduct. However, his posthumously published and voluminous Notebooks (1919-) show a lifelong preoccupation with religion and questions of mortality. In his youth he had considered taking Holy Orders, but later inclined towards a non-specific Romantic mysticism.

Philosophy and modes of experience
Oakeshott published his first book in 1933, Experience and its Modes, when he was thirty-one. He acknowledged the influence of Georg Wilhelm Friedrich Hegel and F. H. Bradley; commentators also noticed resemblances between this work and the ideas of thinkers such as R. G. Collingwood and Georg Simmel.

The book argued that our experience is usually modal, in the sense that we almost always have a governing perspective on the world, be it practical or theoretical. One may take various theoretical approaches to the world: natural science, history and practice, for example, are quite separate, immiscible modes of experience. It is a mistake, he declared, to treat history on the model of the sciences, or to read into it one's current practical concerns.

Philosophy, however, is not a mode. At this stage of his career Oakeshott understood philosophy as the world seen, in Spinoza's phrase, literally "under the aspect of eternity", free from presuppositions, whereas science and history and the practical mode rely on certain assumptions. Later (there is disagreement about exactly when) Oakeshott adopted a pluralistic view of the various modes of experience, with philosophy just one voice among others, though it retained its self-critical character.

According to Oakeshott, the dominating principles of scientific and historical thought are quantity (the world ) and pastness (the world ) respectively. Oakeshott distinguished the academic perspective on the past from the practical, in which the past is seen in terms of its relevance to our present and future. His insistence on the autonomy of history places him close to Collingwood, who also argued for the autonomy of historical knowledge.

The practical world view (the world ) presupposes the ideas of will and value. It is only in terms of these that practical action, for example in politics, economics, and ethics, makes sense. Because all action is conditioned by presuppositions, Oakeshott saw any attempt to change the world as reliant upon a scale of values, which themselves presuppose a context in which this is preferable to that. Even the conservative disposition to maintain the status quo (so long as the latter is tolerable) relies upon managing inevitable change, a point he later elaborated in his essay "On Being Conservative".

Post-war essays

During this period, Oakeshott published what became his best known work during his lifetime, the collection entitled Rationalism in Politics and Other Essays (1962), and notable for its elegance of style. Some of his near-polemics against the direction that Britain was taking, in particular towards socialism, gained Oakeshott a reputation as a traditionalist conservative, sceptical about rationalism and rigid ideologies. Bernard Crick described him as a "lonely nihilist".

Oakeshott's opposition to political utopianism is summed up in his analogy (possibly borrowed from a pamphlet by the 17th-century statesman George Savile, 1st Marquess of Halifax, The Character of a Trimmer) of a ship of state that has "neither starting-place nor appointed destination...[and where] the enterprise is to keep afloat on an even keel". He was a severe critic of E. H. Carr, the Cambridge historian of Soviet Russia, claiming that Carr was fatally uncritical of the Bolshevik regime and took some of its propaganda at face value.

On Human Conduct and Oakeshott's political theory
In his essay "On Being Conservative" (1956) Oakeshott characterised conservatism as a disposition rather than a political stance: "To be conservative ... is to prefer the familiar to the unknown, to prefer the tried to the untried, fact to mystery, the actual to the possible, the limited to the unbounded, the near to the distant, the sufficient to the superabundant, the convenient to the perfect, present laughter to utopian bliss."

Oakeshott's political philosophy, as advanced in On Human Conduct (1975), is free of any recognisable party politics. The book's first part ("On the Theoretical Understanding of Human Conduct") develops a theory of human action as the exercise of intelligent agency in activities such as wanting and choosing, the second ("On the Civil Condition") discusses the formal conditions of association appropriate to such intelligent agents, described as "civil" or legal association, and the third ("On the Character of a Modern European State") examines how far this understanding of human association has affected politics and political ideas in post-Renaissance European history.

Oakeshott suggests that there had been two major modes or understandings of political organization. In the first, which he calls "enterprise association" (or ), the state is (illegitimately) understood as imposing some universal purpose (profit, salvation, progress, racial domination) on its subjects. (As its name indicates, enterprise association is perfectly appropriate to the management of enterprises; however, except in emergencies such as war, where all resources must be commandeered into the pursuit of victory, the state is not an enterprise, properly so called.) By contrast, "civil association" (or ) is primarily a legal relationship in which laws impose obligatory conditions of action but do not require the associates to choose one action rather than another. (Compare Robert Nozick on 'side-constraints'.)

The complex, technical and often rebarbative style of On Human Conduct found few readers, and its initial reception was mostly one of bafflement.  Oakeshott, who rarely responded to critics, replied sardonically in Political Theory to some of the contributions made in a symposium on the book in the same journal.

In his posthumously published The Politics of Faith and the Politics of Scepticism Oakeshott describes enterprise associations and civil associations in different terms. In politics, an enterprise association is based on a fundamental faith in human ability to ascertain and grasp some universal good (leading to the Politics of Faith), and civil association is based on a fundamental scepticism about human ability to either ascertain or achieve this good (leading to the Politics of Scepticism). Oakeshott considers power (especially technological power) as a necessary prerequisite for the Politics of Faith, because it allows people to believe that they can achieve something great and to implement the policies necessary to achieve their goal. The Politics of Scepticism, on the other hand, rests on the idea that government should concern itself with preventing bad things from happening, rather than enabling ambiguously good events. Oakeshott was presumably dissatisfied with this book, which, like much of what he wrote, he never published. It was evidently written well before On Human Conduct.

In the latter book Oakeshott employs the analogy of the adverb to describe the kind of restraint that law involves. Laws prescribe "adverbial conditions": they condition our actions, but they do not determine their substantive chosen ends. For example, the law against murder is not a law against killing as such, but only a law against killing "murderously". Or, to choose a more trivial example, the law does not dictate that I have a car, but if I do, I must drive it on the same side of the road as everybody else. This contrasts with the rules of enterprise associations, in which the actions required by the management are made compulsory for all.

Philosophy of history
In the final work that Oakeshott published in his lifetime, On History (1983), he returned to the idea that history is a distinct mode of experience, but this time building on the theory of action developed in On Human Conduct. Much of On History had emerged from Oakeshott's post-retirement graduate seminars at LSE, and had been written at the same time as On Human Conduct, in the early 1970s.

During the mid-1960s Oakeshott declared an admiration for Wilhelm Dilthey, one of the pioneers of hermeneutics. On History can be interpreted as an essentially neo-Kantian enterprise of working out the conditions of the possibility of historical knowledge, work that Dilthey had begun.

The first three essays set out the distinction between the present of historical experience and the present of practical experience, as well as the concepts of historical situation, historical event, and what is meant by change in history. On History includes an essay on jurisprudence ("The Rule of Law"). It also includes a retelling of The Tower of Babel in a modern setting in which Oakeshott expresses disdain for human willingness to sacrifice individuality, culture, and quality of life for grand collective projects. He attributes this behaviour to fascination with novelty, persistent dissatisfaction, greed, and lack of self-reflection.

Other works
Oakeshott's other works included a reader, already mentioned, on The Social and Political Doctrines of Contemporary Europe. It consisted of selected texts illustrating the main doctrines of liberalism, national socialism, fascism, communism, and Roman Catholicism (1939). He edited Thomas Hobbes's Leviathan (1946), with an introduction that has been recognised as a significant contribution to the literature by some later scholars. Several of Oakeshott's writings on Hobbes were collected and published in 1975 as Hobbes on Civil Association.

With his Cambridge colleague Guy Thompson Griffith, Oakeshott wrote A Guide to the Classics, or How to Pick The Derby Winner (1936), a guide to the principles of successful betting on horse-racing. This was his only published non-academic work.

Oakeshott was the author of well over 150 essays and reviews, most of which have now been republished.

Just before he died Oakeshott approved two edited collections of his works, The Voice of Liberal Learning (1989), a collection of his essays on education, and a second, revised and expanded edition of Rationalism in Politics (1991). Posthumous collections of his writings include Morality and Politics in Modern Europe (1993), a lecture series he gave at Harvard in 1958; Religion, Politics, and the Moral Life (1993), essays mostly from his early and middle periods; and The Politics of Faith and the Politics of Scepticism (1996), an already-mentioned manuscript from the 1950s contemporary with much of Rationalism in Politics but written in a more considered tone.

The bulk of his papers are now in the Oakeshott Archive at the London School of Economics. Further volumes of posthumous writings are in preparation, as is a biography, and a series of monographs devoted to his work were published during the first decade of the 21st century, and continue to be produced.

Bibliography 
 1933. Experience and Its Modes. Cambridge University Press
 1936. A Guide to the Classics, or, How to Pick the Derby Winner. With G.T. Griffith. London: Faber and Faber
 1939. The Social and Political Doctrines of Contemporary Europe. Cambridge: Cambridge University Press
 1941. The Social and Political Doctrines of Contemporary Europe, 2nd edition. Cambridge: Cambridge University Press
 1942. The Social and Political Doctrines of Contemporary Europe with five additional prefaces by F.A. Ogg. Cambridge: Cambridge University Press
 1947. A New Guide to the Derby: How to Pick the Winner. With G.T. Griffith. London: Faber and Faber
 1955. La Idea de Gobierno en la Europa Moderna. Madrid: Ateneo
 1959. The voice of poetry in the conversation of mankind: an essay. Cambridge: Bowes & Bowes
 1962. Rationalism in Politics and Other Essays. London: Methuen (Expanded edition – 1991, by Liberty Fund)
 1966. Rationalismus in der Politik. (trans. K. Streifthau) Neuwied und Berlin: Luchterhard
 1975. On Human Conduct. Oxford: Oxford University Press
 1975. Hobbes on Civil Association. Oxford: Basil Blackwell
 1983. On History and Other Essays. Basil Blackwell
 1985. La Condotta Umana. Bologna: Società Editrice il Mulino
 1989. The Voice of Liberal Learning. New Haven and London: Yale University Press

Posthumous
 1991. Rationalism in Politics and Other Essays. Indianapolis: Liberty Press
 1993. Morality and Politics in Modern Europe. New Haven: Yale University Press
 1993. Religion, Politics, and the Moral Life. New Haven: Yale University Press
 1996. The Politics of Faith and the Politics of Skepticism. New Haven: Yale University Press
 2000. Zuversicht und Skepsis: Zwei Prinzipien neuzeitlicher Politik. (trans. C. Goldmann). Berlin: Fest
 2004. What Is History? And Other Essays. Thorverton: Imprint Academic
 2006. Lectures in the History of Political Thought. Thorverton: Imprint Academic
 2007. The Concept of a Philosophical Jurisprudence: Essays and Reviews 1926–51. Thorverton: Imprint Academic
 2008. The Vocabulary of a Modern European State: Essays and Reviews 1952–88. Thorverton: Imprint Academic
 2010. Early Political Writings 1925–30. Thorverton: Imprint Academic

References

Further reading 
 Corey Abel & Timothy Fuller, eds. The Intellectual Legacy of Michael Oakeshott (Imprint Academic, 2005)
 Corey Abel, ed, The meanings of Michael Oakeshott's Conservatism (Imprint Academic, 2010)
 
 Elizabeth Campbell Corey, Michael Oakeshott on Religion, Aesthetics, and Politics (University of Missouri Press, 2006)
 Paul Franco, Michael Oakeshott: An Introduction (Yale, 2004)
 Paul Franco & Leslie Marsh, eds, A Companion to Michael Oakeshott (Penn State University Press, 2012) . 
 Robert Grant, Oakeshott (The Claridge Press, 1990).
W. H. Greenleaf, Oakeshott's Philosophical Politics (Longmans, 1966).
 Alexandre Guilherme and W. John Morgan, 'Michael Oakeshott (1901-1990)-dialogue as conversation'. Chapter 8 in Philosophy, Dialogue, and Education: Nine modern European philosophers, Routledge, London and New York, pp. 127–139. .
 Till Kinzel, Michael Oakeshott. Philosoph der Politik (Perspektiven, 9) (Antaios, 2007)
 Terry Nardin, The Philosophy of Michael Oakeshott (Penn State, 2001)
 Efraim Podoksik, In Defence of Modernity: Vision and Philosophy in Michael Oakeshott (Imprint Academic, 2003)
 Efraim Podoksik, ed, The Cambridge Companion to Oakeshott (Cambridge University Press, 2012) . 
 Andrew Sullivan, Intimations Pursued: The Voice of Practice in the Conversation of Michael Oakeshott (Imprint Academic, 2007)

External links 

 Michael Oakeshott Association
 The Michael Oakeshott Bibliography
 Michael Oakeshott, "Rationalism in Politics". Cambridge Journal, Volume I, 1947 (broken link – go through your State or Provincial library's subscription service)
 Catalogue of the Oakeshott papers at the Archives Division of the London School of Economics.
 

1901 births
1990 deaths
20th-century British non-fiction writers
20th-century British philosophers
20th-century essayists
20th-century  English historians
Academics of the London School of Economics
Alumni of Gonville and Caius College, Cambridge
Conservatism
Critics of Marxism
English essayists
English male non-fiction writers
English political philosophers
European conservative liberals
Fellows of Nuffield College, Oxford
Fellows of the British Academy
Historians of political thought
Hobbes scholars
Idealists
Lecturers
Liberal conservatism
People educated at St George's School, Harpenden
People from Bromley
Philosophers of art
Philosophers of culture
Philosophers of education
Philosophers of history
Philosophers of law
Philosophers of religion
Philosophy academics
Social philosophers
British Army personnel of World War II